Sibat Tomarchio or more simply Tomarchio is a soft drink beverage company based in Sicily, Italy.

History
Tomarchio was founded in 1920 to produce and bottle soft drinks. The  Cavalier  Filippo Tomarchio, founder of the company, after numerous experiments, devised the recipe for crafting turbid soda (the original). The drink was enclosed in a 250 ml glass bottle that contained a small ball inside, hence the name "The soft drink with the ball".

Initially, the drink was sold door to door in wooden boxes, but only in the province of Catania. Starting in the 1960s, the
distribution expands throughout Sicily: these are the years where the caps and bottles underwent the first changes,
to keep up with the times. Between the 1980s and 1990s, new beverages such as orangeade, chinotto, lemonade, foam and others were born.

The following century Tomarchio consolidated its position in the market, the company is leader in own region for the production of beverages as chinotto, orangeade, lemonade, all based on Sicilian raw materials, but also cola drinks and still others.
It was calculated (in 2015) that in the Sicilian market, Tomarchio sells 34.2% of the orangeade, 25.1% of the lemonade and even 51.3% of the chinotto. Tomarchio has created also a glass line and a Bio line and,  is present in the rest of Italy, in North America, Europe, Asia and Oceania.

Beverage processing method

The Tomarchio company uses only Sicilian citrus juices, as Sicilian red oranges PGI, lemons from Syracuse PGI, blonde oranges from Ribera PDO and essential oils produced by local producers. The water comes from an Etna aquifer, and by filtering through the volcanic rocks it acquires a mineralization that characterizes the drinks.

Projects for the valorization of Sicily 
With a special label, the company has supported a crowdfunding platform, created to support charitable projects through donations from digital users. Sibat Tomarchio has been the protagonist of several projects related to Sicilian territorial marketing such as the participation of the company in the Acireale Carnival. The company has decided to produce some bottles of drinks with a personalized label dedicated to Sicily's oldest Carnival, to promote the economy of the Sicilian region. 

"A path linked to the truest image of sicily made of culture, history, customs, and flavors. With a view to enhancing the local tradition and networking to create development and strengthen the economy, Tomarchio also supports the island's flagship events through the dedicated personalized label: a territorial marketing project that pushes growth and promotion, through synergistic action with realities that represent the excellence of the sector. Synergies that are consolidated from year to year, with new operations aimed at supporting the tourism and promotional program of the land in which Tomarchio has been operating since its inception." - Filippo Tomarchio

Famous testimonials 
 Pippo Baudo
 Adriano Panatta

Awards

BioAwards 2016 
In 2016 at the International trade show for organic and natural products “Sana” (Bologna):
 1st place in the category “Bibite"
 1st place in the category "Charity"

Gold Sofi Award 2019
In 2019 to New York
 1st place in the category "The best cold drink ready to drink"

References

Drink companies of Italy
Companies based in Sicily